The People's Democratic Party of Tajikistan (PDPT;) has been the dominant and ruling party of Tajikistan since 1994. Founded in 1994 by Abdulmajid Dostiev as the People's Party of Tajikistan, the seat of the party is located in the Palace of Unity in Dushanbe, the capital of Tajikistan. Since April 1998, the leader of the party has been the President of Tajikistan, Emomali Rahmon.

According to the party's charter, the PDPT is aimed at creating a "sovereign, democratic, secular, socially-oriented and unitary state with a stable economy". The statute also refers to "hopes for improving the well-being of society, protecting the interests of citizens, regardless of their social status, nationality or religious preferences". The party stands for a secular state and society and is also considered to be Tajik nationalist, statist and authoritarian.

International cooperation
The People's Democratic Party of Tajikistan has bilateral cooperation with foreign political parties including the Russia's ruling party United Russia, with the ruling Nur Otan in Kazakhstan, with the ruling New Azerbaijan Party, and with the Communist Party of China.

Party newspaper
The party newspaper of the PDPT is Minbari Khalq (People's Tribune), published in Tajik, Russian and Uzbek languages twice a week, with a circulation of approximately 30,000 copies. Additionally, the party publishes socio-political magazines, including Mehvar and other magazines.

Electoral history

Presidential elections

Assembly of Representatives elections

References

External links
Official website

1994 establishments in Tajikistan
Anti-clerical parties
Authoritarianism
Nationalist parties in Asia
Political parties established in 1994
Political parties in Tajikistan
Secularism in Tajikistan
Statism